Oliver Lashley (27 October 1915 – 22 November 1995) was a Trinidadian cricketer. He played in one first-class match for Trinidad and Tobago in 1943/44.

See also
 List of Trinidadian representative cricketers

References

External links
 

1915 births
1995 deaths
Trinidad and Tobago cricketers